David Donald Albritton (April 13, 1913 – May 14, 1994) was an American athlete, teacher, coach, and state legislator. He had a long athletic career that spanned three decades and numerous titles and was one of the first high jumpers to use the straddle technique. He was born in Danville, Alabama.

Athletic career
As a sophomore at Ohio State University, Albritton won the National Collegiate Athletic Association championship in 1936.

In 1936, Albritton and Cornelius Johnson both cleared 6 ft 9 in (2.07 m) to set a world record at the Olympic Trials, becoming the first people of African descent to hold the world record in the event. Albritton was second to Johnson at the 1936 Summer Olympics, with a height of 6 ft 6 in (2.00 m).  He claimed the silver medal in a jump-off after he and two other jumpers cleared the same height.

Albritton and Johnson were snubbed by Hitler when they went to collect their medals. In 2016, the 1936 Olympic journey of the eighteen Black American athletes, including Albritton and Jesse Owens was documented in the film Olympic Pride, American Prejudice.

Albritton won or tied for seven National Amateur Athletic Union outdoor titles from 1936 to 1950. He was AAU outdoor champion in 1937, 1946, and 1947 and tied for three national collegiate titles, in 1938, 1945, and 1950.

Coaching and political career
Albritton later became a high school teacher and coach.  He served in the Ohio House of Representatives for six terms. In 1980, he was inducted into the USA Track and Field Hall of Fame.

Death and legacy
David D. Albritton is buried at Woodland Cemetery and Arboretum in Dayton, Ohio. He is located in Section 300 Lot 86.

A historic marker honoring Albritton was unveiled on July 12, 2013 Danville, Alabama.

Link with Jesse Owens
Albritton and Jesse Owens were born in Alabama, Albritton in Danville and Owens in nearby Oakville; both attended East Technical High School in Cleveland, Ohio; both attended the Ohio State University and were coached by Larry Snyder; both were members of Alpha Phi Alpha fraternity; both competed in the 1936 Summer Olympics.

References

 Wallechinsky, David (2004). The Complete Book of the Summer Olympics, Toronto: Sport Classic Books.

External links 
 
 
 

1913 births
1994 deaths
American male high jumpers
African-American male track and field athletes
American athlete-politicians
Athletes (track and field) at the 1936 Summer Olympics
World record setters in athletics (track and field)
Members of the Ohio House of Representatives
Ohio State Buckeyes men's track and field athletes
Olympic silver medalists for the United States in track and field
People from Morgan County, Alabama
Track and field athletes from Alabama
20th-century American politicians
Medalists at the 1936 Summer Olympics
20th-century African-American politicians
African-American men in politics